Inírida , formerly Puerto Inírida, is the capital city, and a municipality, of the department of Guainía in Colombia. It was established in 1963 on the site of the small village of Obando, at the time in the municipality of San Felipe.  The municipality was renamed in 1974.  The municipal population of 31,514 (2018 census) is mostly indigenous and accounts for about a third of the department's population.

History

Prior to 1960 there was little development in the area, which was sparsely populated by almost entirely indigenous people. However, in the 1990s and 2000s, with increased exploitation of the area’s natural resources, efforts have been made to control the local population.

Geography
Located in the llanos at the confluence of the Inírida River and Guaviare River, most of the territory of the municipality of Puerto Inírida is river terrace and bottomland, although there are some hills.

Climate
Inírida has a tropical rainforest climate (Köppen Af). It has heavy to very heavy rainfall year-round.

Economy
The main economic activities in the municipality, aside from government, are agriculture, fishing and cattle raising. Agriculture includes subsistence farming, the production of fiber from the petioles of the young chiquichiqui palm (Bactris speciosa), used for rope, and the rattan known as "Yaré" used for furniture and baskets.

Tourists visit for several activities including fishing, canoeing, sightseeing and hiking. Hotels and hostels have appeared as national and international visitors continue to come. Handicrafts have now become a popular industry, and are supported by government institutions.

Demographics

Transportation

Airports
The local airport is César Gaviria Trujillo Airport , named in honor of a former Colombian president. As of 2007, its runway is serviced by two airlines, Satena, which has three flights a week to and from Bogotá and two flights a week to and from Villavicencio, and Air Colombia, which flies twice a week from the city of Villavicencio, through Barrancominas, Guainía and then arriving at Inírida. This airline operates a Douglas DC-3 which makes the trip an entire adventure. However, the San Fernando de Atabapo airport in Venezuela is just 30 km away. There is also a cargo airline that flies twice a week from Bogotà only.  The airport was formerly known as Aeropuerto Obando.

It is also possible to get to Inírida by the river, but the trip is long and costs almost the same as the flight. Traveling by the river it takes several hours, or even days, depending on the type of craft taken.

Public transportation
With the arrival of more and more people, a public transportation mechanism has been established. Around 500 auto rickshaws provide an efficient and inexpensive means of transportation. The standard fare (which covers almost all the destinations within the town) is around US $.50. There are also mini-vans available for large groups; the fare remains US $.50 per person.

Notes

External links
 Official website of the Inirida municipality
 Aerial photograph of Puerto Inírida c.2000
 Asesoria Presidencial para Las Regiones: Puerto Inírida

Municipalities of Guainía Department
Capitals of Colombian departments
Road-inaccessible communities of Colombia